Smilovice is a municipality and village in Mladá Boleslav District in the Central Bohemian Region of the Czech Republic. It has about 700 inhabitants.

Administrative parts
Villages of Bratronice, Rejšice, Újezd and Újezdec are administrative parts of Smilovice.

Geography
It lies in the Jizera Table. The Vlkava River flows through the municipality.

History
The first written mention of Smilovice is from 1388. The oldest part is Rejšice, first mentioned in 1255. The villages of Újezd and Újezdec were first mentioned in 1383. The modern municipality was created in 1973 by joining the formerly independent municipalities of Rejšice, Újezd and Újezdec to Smilovice.

Sights
The Church of Saint John of Nepomuk is located in Rejšice. It was built in the Baroque style in 1730–1735 by František Ignác Prée and František Maxmilián Kaňka.

References

External links

Villages in Mladá Boleslav District